Ashton Smith (born August 20, 1962) is an American voice actor who has recorded voice-overs for many movie trailers, television commercials, and network promotions. He served as the narrator for the National Geographic documentary program Seconds From Disaster from 2004 to 2007.

References

Sources

External links

1962 births
Living people
American male voice actors